Green Creek is an unincorporated community in Sandusky County, in the U.S. state of Ohio.

History
A post office called Green Creek was established in 1825, and remained in operation until 1852. The community took its name from nearby Green Creek.

References

Unincorporated communities in Sandusky County, Ohio
Unincorporated communities in Ohio